Sitting in Limbo may refer to:

"Sitting in Limbo", a song by Jimmy Cliff from his album Another Cycle
Sitting in Limbo (album), an album by Jessica Molaskey
Sitting in Limbo (1986 film), a Canadian docudrama film 
Sitting in Limbo (2020 film), a British television docudrama film